Is This Rape?: Sex on Trial was a BBC3 television programme.

A group of teenagers, male and female, were housed for two days examining and discussing a fictional film. There was criticism that it was asking onlookers to vote on whether it was rape. It also received praise for raising the issue of consent.

References

BBC television documentaries
Works about rape